A day beacon (sometimes "daybeacon") is an unlighted nautical sea mark. A signboard identifying it is called a day mark. Day beacons typically mark channels whose key points are marked by lighted buoys. They may also mark smaller navigable routes in their entirety. They are the most common navigation aid in shallow water, as they are relatively inexpensive to install and maintain. Navigation around them is similar to that around other navigation aids.

Identification

Lateral marking

For historical reasons, there are two systems for lateral day beacons. When proceeding from open water towards harbor, marks with cylindrical topmarks or square dayboards are kept to port in both regions, but colors and numbers are reversed.

When lateral beacons are paired, vessels should pass between the pairing.  However, beacons are also frequently placed individually. Generally, single lateral beacons are at the inside corner of a turn. Interior or exterior placement can be determined based upon the passing side (port or starboard) dictated by beacon designation. However, a current chart should always be consulted for all but the shallowest-draft vessels, as channel conditions are rarely ideal.

Cardinal marking

Cardinal day beacons are used to indicate the position of a hazard and the direction of safe water as a cardinal direction (north, east, south or west) relative to the mark. This makes them meaningful regardless of the direction or position of the approaching vessel, in contrast to the lateral mark system.

A cardinal day beacon indicates one of the four compass directions by:

 the direction of its two conical top-marks, which can both point up, indicating north; down, indicating south; towards each other, indicating west; or away from each other, indicating east
 its distinctive pattern of black and yellow stripes, which follows the orientation of the cones – the black stripe is in the position pointed to by the cones (e.g. at the top for a north cardinal, in the middle for a west cardinal)

See also
Bowditch's American Practical Navigator
Cardinal mark
Daymark
Safe water mark
Isolated danger mark
Special mark
Lighthouse
Foghorn
Lightvessel

References

Navigational aids
Coastal construction